Lilium debile is a herbaceous plant of the lily family, native to the Russian Far East (Khabarovsk, Sakhalin, Kamchatka and the Kuril Islands). It is related to the taller and more widespread species Lilium medeoloides.

References

Flora of the Russian Far East
Plants described in 1858
debile
Taxa named by Heinrich von Kittlitz